Samuel Downing (19 January 1883 – 1974) was an English association footballer who played for a number of teams including Queens Park Rangers and Chelsea.

Career
Downing's career started at Willesden Town, but spent time at Willesden Green and Park Royal football clubs before being transferred to West Hampstead. He moved to Queens Park Rangers in 1903 where he scored a hat-trick on his debut against Swindon Town.

He moved to Chelsea in April 1909, where he was part of the team that made it to the semi final of the 1910–11 FA Cup and was promoted to the Football League First Division in 1911–12 when they finished second in the Second Division.

After retiring from professional football, he became a cricket coach.

Honours

Chelsea
Football League Second Division second-place promotion – 1911–12

References
General

Specific

1883 births
1974 deaths
Footballers from Willesden
English footballers
Willesden Town F.C. players
West Hampstead F.C. players
Queens Park Rangers F.C. players
Chelsea F.C. players
Croydon Common F.C. players
Southern Football League players
English Football League players
Association football midfielders